The 2013–14 FAI Umbro Intermediate Cup was the 87th season of the FAI Intermediate Cup. Intermediate clubs from the Leinster Senior League, the Munster Senior League and the Ulster Senior League entered the competition.  Avondale United finished as winners after they defeated UCD Reserves 3–0 in the final in Turners Cross. As a result Avondale United also became only the second club after Distillery to win the cup four times in a row. They also became the first club to win the FAI Intermediate Cup seven times, making them the competition's most successful club.

First round
In the first round the tournament is regionalised with clubs from each provincial league playing each other. 
The draw was made on 7 September 2013.

Ulster

Byes:
 Cockhill Celtic
 Drumkeen United
 Kildrum Tigers
 Letterkenny Rovers
 Swilly Rovers

Munster

Byes:

 Blarney United 
 Carrigaline United
 Casement Celtic 
 Castleview 
 Fermoy 
 Leeds 
 Mallow United
 Mayfield United 
 Ringmahon Rangers 
 St. Mary's 
 Temple United 
 Tramore Athletic 
 UCC
 Youghal United

Leinster

Byes:
 Beggsboro
 Belgrove/Home Farm
 Drogheda Town
 Dunboyne
 Firhouse/Clover
 Garda 
 Glenville 
 Greystones
 Greystones United
 Leixlip United  
 Newbridge Town
 Portmarnock 
 Ratoath Harps 
 St. Patrick's C.Y.F.C. 
 Skerries Town 
 Tymon Celtic

Second round
The Second round is also regionalised with clubs from each provincial league playing each other.

Ulster

Munster

Leinster

Third round
The draw for the third round was made on 5 November 2013 by the FAI Domestic Committee.

Fourth round
The draw for this round was made on 4 December 2013 by the FAI Domestic Committee. The 16 teams that reach the fourth round also qualified for the 2014 FAI Cup.

Quarter-finals
The draw for the quarter-final was made on 4 February 2014 by the FAI Domestic Committee.

Semi-finals
The draw for the quarter-final was made on 5 March 2014 by the FAI Domestic Committee.

Final

References

2013 in Republic of Ireland association football cups
2014 in Republic of Ireland association football cups
2013–14 domestic association football cups
2013-14